Imperial and Royal Field Marshal is a 1930 Czechoslovak comedy film  directed by Karel Lamač. It is considered to be the first ever Czech language sound film.

Cast
Vlasta Burian ...  František Procházka, false Imperial and Royal Field Marshal
Theodor Pištěk as Colonel Alois Přecechtěl
Helena Monczáková as Přecechtělová, colonel's wife
 as  Lili Přecechtělová, their daughter
Jiří Hron as Lieutenant Rudi Eberle
Jan W. Speerger as Military servant Sepll
Čeněk Šlégl as  Count Géza von Medák, Rittmeister
Jindřich Plachta as  Hofer, first lieutenant
Josef Horánek as  Real Imperial and Royal Field Marshal
Olga Augustová as Singer
Eman Fiala as  Gustav Jannings, cabaret singer
Otto Heller as  Soldier
Jaroslav Marvan as  Maršálek's servant
Josef Rovenský as  Mayor

External links
 

1930 films
1930s Czech-language films
1930 comedy films
Czechoslovak black-and-white films
Films directed by Karel Lamač
Czechoslovak multilingual films
Czechoslovak comedy films
1930 multilingual films
1930s Czech films